Andrew Joseph Vollert (born March 15, 1995, age 27) is an American football tight end who is a free agent. He played college football at Weber State in Ogden, Utah.

College career
Vollert played two seasons at San Jose State, followed by year at San Francisco City College, before transferring to Weber State. He was an FCS All-American in 2016 and 2017 for the Wildcats, totaling 123 receptions for 1,613 yards and 12 touchdowns. He also played basketball at San Jose State in the 2014-15 season.

Professional career

Arizona Cardinals
Vollert signed with the Arizona Cardinals as an undrafted free agent on April 30, 2018. In the preseason, he caught 8 of 9 targets for 55 yards. He was waived on September 1, 2018 and was signed to the practice squad the next day. He is currently healthy and was released on October 31, 2018.

Cincinnati Bengals
On November 5, 2018, Vollert was signed to the Cincinnati Bengals practice squad. He signed a reserve/future contract with the Bengals on December 31, 2018. The Bengals waived Vollert on May 22, 2019.

Los Angeles Chargers
Vollert was claimed off waivers on May 23, 2019 by the Los Angeles Chargers. After a strong start to camp, he suffered a torn ACL in the preseason and was placed on injured reserve on August 12, 2019. He had one catch for 25 yards before the injury.  He was waived on August 1, 2020.  His colorful release highlighted HBO's Hard Knocks Season 16 premier.

Carolina Panthers
On August 16, 2020, Vollert signed with the Carolina Panthers. He was waived four days later.

Indianapolis Colts
Vollert was claimed off waivers by the Indianapolis Colts on August 21, 2020. He was waived on September 5, 2020. On December 23, 2020, Vollert re-signed with the Colts' practice squad. On December 31, 2020, Vollert was released from the practice squad. On January 10, 2021, Vollert signed a reserve/futures contract with the Colts.

On August 31, 2021, Vollert was waived/injured and placed on injured reserve with an ankle injury. He was released on September 9, 2021 with an injury settlement.

References

External links
Weber State bio

1995 births
Living people
Arizona Cardinals players
Carolina Panthers players
Cincinnati Bengals players
City College of San Francisco Rams football players
Indianapolis Colts players
Los Angeles Chargers players
People from San Mateo, California
Players of American football from California
San Jose State Spartans football players
Sportspeople from the San Francisco Bay Area
Weber State Wildcats football players